The Yugoslav torpedo boat T5 was a sea-going torpedo boat operated by the Royal Yugoslav Navy between 1921 and 1941. Originally 87 F, a 250t-class torpedo boat of the Austro-Hungarian Navy built in 1914–1915, she was armed with two  guns and four  torpedo tubes, and could carry 10–12 naval mines. She saw active service during World War I, performing convoy, patrol, escort and minesweeping tasks, anti-submarine operations and shore bombardment missions. Following Austria-Hungary's defeat in 1918, 87 F was allocated to the Navy of the Kingdom of Serbs, Croats and Slovenes, which became the Royal Yugoslav Navy, and was renamed T5. At the time, she and the seven other 250t-class boats were the only modern sea-going vessels of the fledgling maritime force.

During the interwar period, T5 and the rest of the navy were involved in exercises of training and cruises to friendly ports, but activity was limited by reduced naval budgets. The ship was captured by the Italians during the German-led Axis invasion of Yugoslavia in April 1941. After her main armament was modernised, she served with the Royal Italian Navy under her Yugoslav designation, conducting coastal and second-line escort duties in the Adriatic Sea. Following the Italian capitulation in September 1943, she was returned to the Royal Yugoslav Navy-in-exile and served as T5. At the end of the war, she was transferred to the new Yugoslav Navy and served as Cer until she was broken up in 1962.

Background
In 1910, the Austria-Hungary Naval Technical Committee initiated the design and development of a  coastal torpedo boat, specifying that it should be capable of sustaining  for 10 hours. This specification was based on an expectation that the Strait of Otranto, where the Adriatic Sea meets the Ionian Sea, would be blockaded by hostile forces during a future conflict. In such circumstances, there would be a need for a torpedo boat that could sail from the Austro-Hungarian Navy base at the Bay of Kotor to the Strait during the night, locate and attack blockading ships and return to port before morning. Steam turbine power was selected for propulsion, because diesels with the necessary power were not available, and the Austro-Hungarian Navy did not have the practical experience to run turbo-electric boats. Stabilimento Tecnico Triestino (STT) of Trieste was selected for the contract to build the first eight vessels, designated the T-group. Another tender was requested for four more boats, but when a competing boatbuilder, Ganz-Danubius, reduced their price by ten percent, a total of sixteen boats were ordered from them, designated the F-group. The F-group designation signified the location of Ganz-Danubius' main shipyard at Fiume.

Description and construction
The crew consisted of 38–41 officers and enlisted men. The boats were powered by two AEG-Curtiss steam turbines driving two propellers, using steam generated by two Yarrow water-tube boilers, one of which burned fuel oil and the other coal. The F-group had two funnels rather than the single funnel of the T-group. Due to inadequate funding, 87 F and the rest of the 250t class were essentially coastal vessels, despite the original intention that they would be used for "high seas" operations. They were the first small Austro-Hungarian Navy boats to use turbines, and this contributed to ongoing problems.

The boats were armed with two Škoda  L/30 guns, and four  torpedo tubes. They could also carry 10–12 naval mines. 87 F was laid down on 5 March 1914, launched on 20 March 1915 and completed on 25 October of that year.

Career

World War I
During World War I, 87 F was used for convoy, patrol, escort and minesweeping tasks, anti-submarine operations, and shore bombardment missions. On 3 February 1916, 87 F and two other 250t-class boats were involved in a shore bombardment operation against Ortona and San Vito Chietino, led by the armoured cruiser . On 9 July, the scout cruiser  led a force which included 87 F and two s in a raid on the Otranto Barrage, the Allied naval blockade of the Strait of Otranto, which resulted in the sinking of two drifters. On 4 November, three Italian destroyers and three torpedo boats were involved in a brief encounter in the northern Adriatic with two Austro-Hungarian destroyers accompanied by 87 F and two other 250t-class boats. The following day, the same three torpedo boats conducted a shore bombardment of Sant'Elpidio a Mare. In 1917, one of her 66 mm guns was placed on an anti-aircraft mount. On 28 November 1917, a number of 250t-class boats were involved in two shore bombardment missions. In the second mission, 87 F joined seven other 250t-class boats and six destroyers for the bombardment of Porto Corsini, Marotta and Cesenatico.

By 1918, the Allies had strengthened their ongoing blockade on the Strait of Otranto, as foreseen by the Austro-Hungarian Navy. As a result, it was becoming more difficult for the German and Austro-Hungarian U-boats to get through the strait and into the Mediterranean Sea. In response to these blockades, the new commander of the Austro-Hungarian Navy, Konteradmiral Miklós Horthy, decided to launch an attack on the Allied defenders with battleships, scout cruisers, and destroyers. About 03:15 on 10 June, while returning from an uneventful patrol off the Dalmatian coast, two Royal Italian Navy MAS boats, MAS 15 and MAS 21, spotted the smoke from the Austrian ships. Both boats successfully penetrated the escort screen and split to engage the dreadnoughts individually. MAS 21 attacked Tegetthoff, but her torpedoes missed. Under the command of Luigi Rizzo, MAS 15 fired two torpedoes at 03:25, both of which hit Szent István. Both boats evaded pursuit. The torpedo hits on Szent István were abreast her boiler rooms, which flooded, knocking out power to the pumps. Szent István capsized less than three hours after being torpedoed. In October 1918, 87 F was at Durazzo in Albania when the port was bombarded by a multinational Allied naval force. She escaped with minor damage, in what was the last major action involving the Austro-Hungarian Navy.

Interwar period
87 F survived the war intact. In 1920, under the terms of the previous year's Treaty of Saint-Germain-en-Laye by which rump Austria officially ended World War I, she was allocated to the Kingdom of Serbs, Croats and Slovenes (KSCS, later Yugoslavia). Along with three other 250t-class F-group boats, 93 F, 96 F and 97 F, and four 250t-class T-group boats, she served with the Royal Yugoslav Navy (KJRM; Краљевска Југословенска Ратна Морнарица). Transferred in March 1921, in KJRM service, 87 F was renamed T5. In 1925, exercises were conducted off the Dalmatian coast, involving the majority of the navy. It is not clear if T5 was one of the torpedo boats involved. The ships and crews made a very good impression while visiting Malta. In 1932, the British naval attaché reported that Yugoslav ships engaged in few exercises, manoeuvres or gunnery training due to reduced budgets.

World War II and post-war service
In April 1941, Yugoslavia entered World War II when it was invaded by the German-led Axis powers. At the time of the invasion, T5 was assigned to the 3rd Torpedo Division located at Šibenik, which included her three former F-group sisters. On 8 April, the four boats of the 3rd Torpedo Division, along with other vessels, were tasked to support an attack on the Italian enclave of Zara on the Dalmatia coast. They were subjected to three Italian air attacks and, after the last one, sailed from the area of Zaton into Lake Prokljan, where they remained until 11 April. On 12 April, the 3rd Torpedo Division arrived at Milna on the island of Brač, and refused to follow orders to sail to the Bay of Kotor. All four former F-group boats were then captured by the Italians.

T5 was then operated by the Italians under her Yugoslav designation, conducting coastal and second-line escort duties in the Adriatic. Her guns were replaced by two  L/40 anti-aircraft guns, but no other significant alterations were made to her. After the Italians capitulated in September 1943, she was returned to the KJRM-in-exile in December of that year.  T5 was commissioned by the Yugoslav Navy after the war, and renamed Cer. She was fitted with two  guns on single mounts and one  gun, and her torpedo tubes were also removed. She served until 1962, when she was broken up.

See also
 List of ships of the Royal Yugoslav Navy
 List of ships of the Yugoslav Navy

Notes

Footnotes

References

 
 
 
 
 
 
 
 
 
 
 
 
 
 
 
 
 

1915 ships
Naval ships of Yugoslavia captured by Italy during World War II
Ships built in Fiume
Ships of the Royal Yugoslav Navy
Ships of the Yugoslav Navy
Torpedo boats of the Austro-Hungarian Navy
Torpedo boats of the Royal Yugoslav Navy
World War I torpedo boats of Austria-Hungary
Captured ships